LGA 2066, also called Socket R4, is a CPU socket by Intel that debuted with Skylake-X and Kaby Lake-X processors in June 2017. It replaces Intel's LGA 2011-3 (R3) in the performance, high-end desktop and Workstation platforms (based on the X299 "Basin Falls" and C422 chipsets), while LGA 3647 (Socket P) replaces LGA 2011-3 (R3) in the server platforms based on Skylake-SP (Xeon "Purley").

Compatible processors

High-End Desktop (HEDT)
All of these CPUs require the Intel X299 chipset to work. So, the C422 chipset is strictly limited to work with workstation processors only.

Kaby Lake-X
Kaby Lake-X processors were discontinued in May 2018. Starting October 2019, BIOS updates for most of the X299-based motherboards removed support for Kaby Lake-X processors.

Skylake-X 7000-series

Skylake-X 9000-series

Cascade Lake-X

Workstation 
Take note that certain types of Xeon processors will not work on this socket, like Skylake-P.

Skylake-W

Cascade Lake-W

References

Intel CPU sockets